The Rutgers School of Health Professions (abbreviated SHP, also known as Rutgers SHP) is one of the schools that form Rutgers Biomedical and Health Sciences, a division of Rutgers, The State University of New Jersey. The school has campuses in Newark, Piscataway, Scotch Plains, and Stratford, New Jersey. SHP was formerly the School of Health Related Professions of the now-defunct University of Medicine and Dentistry of New Jersey (UMDNJ).

External links
Rutgers School of Health Professions

Rutgers University colleges and schools
University of Medicine and Dentistry of New Jersey
Education in Camden, New Jersey
Education in Newark, New Jersey
Educational institutions established in 1973
1973 establishments in New Jersey
Healthcare in New Jersey
Universities and colleges in Camden County, New Jersey
Universities and colleges in Essex County, New Jersey
Scotch Plains, New Jersey
Piscataway, New Jersey